Savi's pine vole (Microtus savii) is a species of rodent in the family Cricetidae.
It is found in France and Italy.

References

  Database entry includes a brief justification of why this species is of least concern.
Musser, G. G. and M. D. Carleton. 2005. Superfamily Muroidea. pp. 894–1531 in Mammal Species of the World a Taxonomic and Geographic Reference. D. E. Wilson and D. M. Reeder eds. Johns Hopkins University Press, Baltimore.

Microtus
Mammals described in 1838
Taxonomy articles created by Polbot